The Rivière à l'Ours Ouest (English: West Bear River) is a tributary of the rivière à l'Ours, flowing in the municipality of Havre-Saint-Pierre, in the Minganie Regional County Municipality, in the administrative region of Côte-Nord, in the province of Quebec, in Canada.

Except for the route 138 serving the lower part of the Bear River, this valley is served by winter snowmobile routes.

The surface of the West Bear River is usually frozen from the beginning of November to the end of April, except the rapids areas; however, traffic on the ice is generally safe from late November to early April.

Geography 
The West Bear River takes its source from an unidentified lake located in Havre-Saint-Pierre. This head lake surrounded by a set of small lakes. The mouth of this head lake is located on the northeast shore. This mouth is located at:
  north-east of downtown Havre-Saint-Pierre;
  north-west of the mouth of the Bear River.

  towards the north-east by crossing four small lakes, then towards the south-east by crossing the fourth lake, to its mouth;
  south-east across Lake Cormier, to its mouth;
  south-east across Lake Mannier, to its mouth;
  south-east crossing Little Uatnakantuk lake, up to its mouth;
  south-east, up to the outlet of the detour stream (coming from the south-west);
  first towards the south-east, then towards the east by forming a few loops, crossing areas of marsh, up to a river (coming from the north-west);
  to the east, forming a hook towards the north, to its mouth.

The West Bear River flows onto the southwest bank of the Rivière à l'Ours, in an area where there are several marsh areas. This confluence is located at:

  north of route 138;
  north-west of the mouth of Rivière à l'Ours;
  south-west of Baie-Johan-Beetz;
  north-east of the village center of Havre-Saint-Pierre.

Toponymy 
The toponym "Rivière à l'Ours Ouest" was formalized on December 5, 1968, at the Place Names Bank of the Commission de toponymie du Québec.

See also 

 List of rivers of Quebec

References 

Rivers of Côte-Nord
Minganie Regional County Municipality